Falling Into You: Around the World is the seventh world concert tour by Canadian pop singer, Céline Dion. It was organized to support one of the best selling albums of all time, support her fourth English-language and fourteenth studio album Falling into You (1996), which has sold over 32 million copies.

Background
In February 1996, Céline Dion announced the launch of her tour in support of a new album. Dion toured Australia, Canada, United States, and many countries in Europe and Asia. In all, the tour lasted more than a year, with 149 shows in 17 different countries.

The sold-out tour began on 18 March 1996 in Perth, Australia and continued to major cities around the world. It ended on 28 June 1997 in Nice, France. In June 1997, Céline Dion toured the biggest stadiums in Europe and sang before huge crowds ranging from 35,000 to 70,000 people. At the end of the Asian leg, in early 1997, Dion performed for the sultan in Brunei. Worldwide attendance was about 1.7 million.

Opening acts
 Soul Attorneys
 The Corrs (Selected Dates In Both US And Europe)
 Mike and the Mechanics
 Human Nature

Set list

 "The Power of Love"
 "Falling into You"
 "River Deep, Mountain High"
 "Seduces Me"
 "All by Myself"
 "Pour que tu m'aimes encore"
 "J'irai où tu iras"
 "If You Asked Me To"
 "Beauty and the Beast"
 "When I Fall in Love"
 "Where Does My Heart Beat Now"
 "Misled"
 "Declaration of Love"
 "It's All Coming Back to Me Now"
 "To Love You More"
 "Le ballet"
 "Love Can Move Mountains"
 "Fly"
 "Call the Man"
 "The Power of the Dream"
 "Twist and Shout"
 "Because You Loved Me"

 "The Power of Love"
 "Falling into You"
 "River Deep, Mountain High"
 "Seduces Me"
 "All by Myself"
 "Pour que tu m'aimes encore"
 "J'irai où tu iras"
 "Only One Road"
 "Beauty and the Beast"
 "Where Does My Heart Beat Now"
 "Misled"
 "Declaration of Love"
 "It's All Coming Back to Me Now"
 "Le ballet"
 "Love Can Move Mountains"
 "Because You Loved Me"
 "Twist and Shout"
 "(You Make Me Feel Like) A Natural Woman"
 "The Power of the Dream"
 "Think Twice"

 "Je sais pas"
 "Destin"
 "The Power of Love"
 "Falling into You"
 "Regarde-moi"
 "River Deep, Mountain High"
 "Un garçon pas comme les autres (Ziggy)"
 "All by Myself"
 "Because You Loved Me"
 "Love Can Move Mountains"
 "Declaration of Love"
 "It's All Coming Back to Me Now"
 "Les derniers seront les premiers"
 "J'irai où tu iras"
 "Le ballet"
 "Prière païenne"
 "The Power of the Dream"
 "Quand on n'a que l'amour"
 "Pour que tu m'aimes encore"
 "Vole"

Additional notes
"It's All Coming Back To Me Now" was not performed in one (or both) concerts in Ghent, Belgium.
"Falling into You", "Fly", and "Where Does My Heart Beat Now" were removed from the set list in March 1997.
"To Love You More" was the final song during the Asian leg of the tour.
During the second European leg "(You Make Me Feel Like) A Natural Woman" was removed from the set list and was replaced by "Call the Man."
"Because You Loved Me" was the final song during the second European leg of the tour.
 "Quand on n'a que l'amour" was performed in August 1996 in Las Vegas.
 "Les derniers seront les premiers" was performed on 18 October at Rotterdam.

Tour dates

Box office score data

Broadcasts and recordings

The 14–15 March 1997 shows at the Mid-South Coliseum in Memphis, Tennessee, were filmed and the concert aired on television. It was also released on VHS in November 1998. The DVD was supposed to be released on 27 February 2008 in Japan but it was cancelled.

The Zurich concert in 1996 was recorded for a promo release as a live CD. Limited copies of this CD were made.

Concerts in both Australia and Montreal were recorded and broadcast as television specials. The Australia concert special featured four songs and interviews with Dion about the new album. The Montreal special featured six songs. The performances of "All By Myself" and "To Love You More" from the Montreal concert were later used as live music videos.

Personnel
Tour director: Bud Scheatzle
Production director: Ian Donald
Assistant to the tour director: Michel Dion
Front of house sound engineer: Denis Savage
Stage sound engineer: Daniel Baron
Sound system technicians: François Desjardins, Marc Beauchamp, Marc Thériault
Lighting director: Yves Aucoin
Assistant lighting director: Normand Chassé
Video Director : Yves "kiwwi" Lefebvre
Camera tech : Yves "Uncle Bill" Beriault, Louis Lefebvre
Lighting technicians: Jean-François Canuel, Antoine Malette, Michel Pommerleau
Band gear technicians: Jean-François Dubois, Guy Vignola, Stéphane Hamel
Set: Tonje Wold, Donald Chouinard
Head rigger: Frédéric Morosovsky
Production assistant: Patrick Angélil
Tour assistant: Louise Labranche
Assistant to Céline: Manon Dion
Bodyguard: Eric Burrows
Hairstylist: Louis Hechter
Stylist: Annie L. Horth
Choreographer: Dominique Giraldeau
Musicians' wardrobe: D-U-B-U-C mode de vie

Band
Musical director and keyboards: Claude "Mego" Lemay
Drums: Dominique Messier
Bass: Marc Langis
Keyboards: Yves Frulla
Guitars: André Coutu
Percussion: Paul Picard
Violin on "To Love You More": Taro Hakase
Backing vocals: Terry Bradford, Rachelle Jeanty (1996), Julie LeBlanc (1997)
Backing vocals and Cello: Elise Duguay

References

Celine Dion concert tours
1996 concert tours
1997 concert tours